Patrick O'Dea may refer to:

Patrick O'Dea (public servant) (1917–2010), New Zealand public servant
Pat O'Dea (Patrick John O'Dea, 1872–1962), Australian rules and American football player